Filipe André Martins Freitas Ferreira (born 20 September 1996) is a Portuguese professional footballer who plays for Penafiel as a goalkeeper.

Club career
On 6 August 2017, Ferreira made his professional debut with Braga B in a 2017–18 LigaPro match against União Madeira.

References

External links

1996 births
People from Santo Tirso
Living people
Portuguese footballers
Portugal youth international footballers
Association football goalkeepers
FC Porto B players
C.D. Nacional players
U.D. Oliveirense players
S.C. Braga B players
F.C. Penafiel players
Campeonato de Portugal (league) players
Liga Portugal 2 players
Sportspeople from Porto District